A Kindred Spirit is a television drama series that was broadcast on TVB Jade in Hong Kong from 15 May 1995 to 13 November 1999. It is one of the longest running drama shows in Hong Kong television history (the longest being the sitcom Hong Kong 81 series). Its exceptional longevity is unusual for a city where scripted TV drama programs typically only last around 20 episodes. The total number of episodes is 1,128. One episode were aired per day, on Monday to Friday.

The show centres on a family who operates a barbecue pork (char siu) restaurant in Happy Valley, Hong Kong, and their life.

Cast

As the show progressed, more and more new characters were added into the show, as in a soap opera. The show finally ended on 13 November 1999 with a lavish farewell that included all the actors who participated in the show from past to present.

Main cast

Impact on Hong Kong culture
The show's impact on Hong Kong culture is immense, although its influence is fading away as new series are being aired. Everyone can remember the approximate arc of the story and most can sing the theme song.

The impact of the show on its cast is enormous, some actors have suffered a form of "curse" from the series, being that they can never break out of their mold that were set during this series. A good example is the actor, Timothy Cheng, who played Ji Ho in the series. His performance on the series was so convincing and memorable that it has prevented him from playing heroes or protagonists since his run on the show ended (though he did play some protagonist roles recently).

Kindred Spirit is shown in Hong Kong on TVB's Grand Theatre Channel, which belongs to TVB's new pay television services. The show aired in Canada via Fairchild TV.

The show was previously on rerun on Thursday, 13 September 2007 from Monday to Friday at 2:15pm on TVB Jade in Hong Kong. It currently airing from Monday to Friday at 10:00am on TVB Jade.

See also
List of longest films by running time
List of television programs by episode count

References

TVB dramas
1995 Hong Kong television series debuts
1999 Hong Kong television series endings
Cantonese-language television shows